Rhodanobacter ginsengisoli is a bacterium from the genus of Rhodanobacter which has been isolated from soil from a ginseng field from Yeongju in Korea.

References

Xanthomonadales
Bacteria described in 2007